Paraona splendens is a moth of the family Erebidae. It was described by Arthur Gardiner Butler in 1877. It is found in India.

References

 Arctiidae genus list at Butterflies and Moths of the World of the Natural History Museum

Lithosiina
Moths described in 1877